Sturm der Liebe ("Storm of Love") is a German television soap opera created by Bea Schmidt for Das Erste. It premiered on 26 September 2005.

It follows in several interwoven plot threads stories about relationships taking place in the fictional five-star hotel Fürstenhof, located in Feldkirchen-Westerham near Rosenheim. The plot revolves around members of the family room area, the hotel owners, and employees.

The series began production on 1 August 2005 and was originally broadcast beginning 26 September 2005 on weekdays at 15:10.

In France, the series was broadcast from episode 1392 (season 7) since 2 April 2013 on France 2 with the name of "Le Tourbillon de l'Amour" and in Austria, the series was broadcast from episode 166 onwards since mid-July 2006 on ORF 2. A summary of episodes 1 to 165 was broadcast as a pilot.

Storm of Love has been licensed to 20 stations worldwide, and rights to all episodes were given to RTVS (Slovakia), LTV1 (Latvia), TV 3 (Lithuania), TV3 (Estonia) and Rete 4 (Italy). Rete 4 broadcasts the series under the name Tempesta d'amore. Nova TV in Bulgaria has broadcast the series since the end of July 2009 under a title translating as "Winds of Love." VTM3 in Belgium broadcasts under the title Sturm der liebe. Polish channel TV Puls broadcasts it under the title Burza uczuć, Finnish channel Sub under the title Lemmen viemää, and Icelandic channel RÚV under the title Ástareldur (Fire of Love).

Main characters 
Werner once married Charlotte Saalfeld, heir to Fürstenhof. For many years he was director of the 5-star hotel. After almost 40 years, he finally reconciled with his brother André, and hired him as a cook at the Fürstenhof. His habit of dating beautiful women has not changed. He cheated on his wife Charlotte over and over again, which eventually led to divorce after 36 years of marriage.

Charlotte Saalfeld is once again at the Fürstenhof to attend a charity event and receive the Bavarian Order of Merit. In the end, she remains at Fürstenhof longer than expected. As a former practitioner of Saalfeld, Korbinian Niederbühl, along with his housekeeper Cosima Zastrow appear at Fürstenhof and it is revealed, that not Charlotte, but Cosima is the "real" Saalfeld.  Charlotte fights with Werner, because she turns over their 30% of Fürstenhof shares to Cosima. Charlotte was engaged for some time with Korbinian Niederbühl's son Michael, but when she realizes that Michael has feelings for Tanja, the mother of his child, she separates from him.

Werner and Charlotte are now back as Fürstenhof's shareholders with 20 and 30%. Recently, they suffered a defeat by the acquittal of their common and Werner's archrival ex-wife Barbara of Heidenberg, especially when Barbara returns to the Fürstehof as a woman on the side of Götz Zastrow. Since their daughter Miriam died giving birth to her daughter Valentina, they take care of their granddaughter.  They now become closer to their very busy, now widowed, son Robert. The harmony between Charlotte and Werner is getting better and Charlotte to one side as it is complicated by a cabal Barbara in a drug scandal.

The flagship couple Alfons and Hildegard Sonnbichler have been employees of the Fürstenhof for decades; she in the kitchen, and he a very capable concierge. Alfons enjoys a special relationship of mutual trust with the Saalfelds, partly because he had a relationship as a teenager with Charlotte Saalfeld, and they had a child together, Alexander. Hildegard is involved in the local city council and was a candidate for mayor. Their daughter is Marie Sonnbichler, who since has left the Fürstenhof.

André Konopka is the younger brother of Werner Saalfeld and has at last after many years reconciled with him. He works as a chef for him and Werner in turn has a confidant. Furthermore, André is, with Alfons, a board member of the newly formed council at the court. His nephew, Robert has returned after the death of his wife, Miriam, to the hotel, and acts as a second chef to André. André's son Simon has now gone with his wife, Maike, to South Africa and works with winemaker Jasper Steenkamp at his father's estate.

Nils Heinemann arrives at the Fürstenhof, to win back Marie Sonnbichler, with whom he had fallen in love in Thalheim. Since he has mistreated her, it will take some time before Marie will let him back into her life. The two argue incessantly.  When Marie finally learns that Nils is married, they finally break up.

Michael Niederbühl comes to the Fürstenhof to take over the practice of the Canadian Evelyn Konopka. His father, Korbinian, was the unwitting accomplice of Ludwig Saalfeld, now through Charlotte and Cosima. Michael falls in love with Charlotte and plans to marry her.  Charlotte later learns that Michael has a son (Fabien) with Tania Libertz, the product of a one-night stand.  She also discovers that Michael has developed feelings for he, so she ends their relationship. Michael also has a grown daughter, Debbie Williams, from a previous relationship with an American.

Cast

Protagonists couples

Current main characters 
 katrin anne hess caroline lamprecht  3814 2022

stefan  hartmann max richter  3500 2020

johannes huth gerry richter 2021 3656

sabine werner helene richter  2022 3862

Current supporting actors

Former main actors 
julia  gruber  amelie  limbach 3400 3540 2020 2021
christopher reinahrdt  3345  3485 2020
markus pfeiffer  dirk baumgartner  3297  3431 2019 2020
julia grimpe linda baumgartner 3233 3446 2019 2020

Former supporting actors

Celebrity Guest Performer

Background 
The Bavaria TV Production GmbH (until 31 January 2007: Bavaria Film GmbH) produces the series since the summer of 2005 in the studios of Bavaria Film in Green Forest in Munich. Per day of shooting creates a complete sequence (Length 48 minutes, episode 111–150: 43 minutes). Storm of Love is produced digitally: The external rotation, the images stored directly to disk, the interior rotation is recorded on a deck. The cameras are all connected directly by cable to the cut. Since episode 447 the series in widescreen format 16:9 is broadcast. Chief author of the series Peter Süß is. ARD Degeto is responsible for editorial work, but also transfers it to the WDR and in part from the BR.

Originally as a telenovela created with 100 episodes,stormof love has been extended several times. Meanwhile, in 1270 episodes planned . This feature of the genre of the finiteness of a soap opera was cancelled trend. Since all the other features for the characterisation of a telenovela – and differentiation from other genres such as the soap opera – have been maintained despite the extensions, is one of lovestormstill one of the telenovelas.

Each main plot arc of the series is dubbed by a female lead and the voice over, a heritage from the original telenovela concept of an internal cohesion. This voice-over-starring roles played Henriette Richter-Röhl (episodes 1–313 from 26 September 2005 to 31 January 2007), Inez Bjørg David (episodes 319–520 from 12 February to 18 December 2007), Dominique Siassia (episodes 528–703 from 4 January to 8 October 2008), Ivanka Brekalo (episodes 704–914 from 9 October 2008 to 14 September 2009), Ute Katharina Kampowsky (episodes 915–933 from 15 September to 9 October 2009 in a transitional season), Sarah Stork (episodes 934–1117 from 12 October 2009 to 5 August 2010), Uta Kargel (episodes 1118–1391 from 6 August 2010 to 10 October 2011), Ines Lutz (episodes 1392–1600 from 11 October 2011 to 5 September 2012), Lucy Scherer (episodes 1601–1813 from 6 September 2012 to 1 August 2013), Liza Tzschirner (episodes 1815–2066 from 5 August 2013 to 10 September 2014), Jennifer Newrkla (episodes 2067–2265 from 11 September 2014 to 28 July 2015) and Magdalena Steinlein (episodes 2266– since 29 July 2015).

On 26 January 2010 was broadcast the episode 1000th The anniversary was telenovela script comes with a big party and fireworks to "250 years Fürstenhof implemented Following this episode was one of Sepp Schauer (Alfons Sonnbichler) and Judith Hildebrandt (Tanja Liebertz) moderated, 50 -minute "anniversary special storm of love – happiness and tears at the court." aired a special broadcast on ARD and ORF 2

Bias 
With each new season, a new header is assembled, which initiates the respective impacts and introduces the most important roles of the main season. Within the season of the bias is changed only slightly. Previous versions:

 Season 1: Henriette Richter-Röhl, Gregory B. Waldis, Dirk Galuba, Mona Seefried (later: Inez Bjørg David & Nicola Tiggeler), Claudia Wenzel (later: Antje Hagen & Sepp Schauer), Lorenzo Patané
 Season 2: Inez Bjørg David, Lorenzo Patané, Dirk Galuba, Nicola Tiggeler, Antje Hagen & Sepp Schauer, Judith Hildebrandt
 Season 3: Dominique Siassia, Christof Arnold, Dirk Galuba, Antje Hagen & Sepp Schauer, Joachim Lätsch & Caroline Beil, Anna Angelina Wolfers, Martin Gruber & Susan Hoecke
 Season 4: Ivanka Brekalo, Martin Gruber, Dirk Galuba, Antje Hagen & Sepp Schauer, René Oltmanns & Joachim Lätsch & Heike Trinker, Nicola Tiggeler, Natalie Alison, Susan Hoecke
 Season 5: Sarah Stork, Wolfgang Cerny, Dirk Galuba, Antje Hagen & Sepp Schauer, Mona Seefried, René Oltmanns & Joachim Lätsch, Gabrielle Scharnitzky & Natalie Alison, Florian Stadler & Johannes Hauer
 Season 6: Uta Kargel, Lorenzo Patané, Mona Seefried & Dirk Galuba, Antje Hagen & Sepp Schauer, Natalie Alison & René Oltmanns & Joachim Lätsch, Andreas Borcherding & Nicola Tiggeler, Florian Stadler & Johannes Hauer (later: Erich Altenkopf & Judith Hildebrandt & Florian Stadler)
 Season 7: Ines Lutz, Moritz Tittel & Daniel Fünffrock, Mona Seefried & Dirk Galuba, Antje Hagen & Sepp Schauer, Natalie Alison (later: Erich Altenkopf) & Joachim Lätsch, Simone Ritscher, Erich Altenkopf (later: Jan van Weyde) & Judith Hildebrandt & Florian Stadler
 Season 8: Lucy Scherer & Moritz Tittel, Melanie Wiegmann, Mona Seefried & Dirk Galuba, Antje Hagen & Sepp Schauer, Simone Ritscher, Michele Oliveri, Erich Altenkopf & Joachim Lätsch, Jan van Weyde (later: David Paryla) & Florian Stadler
 Season 9: Liza Tzschirner, Christian Feist, Mona Seefried & Dirk Galuba, Antje Hagen & Sepp Schauer, Nadine Warmuth & Dietrich Adam, Erich Altenkopf & Melanie Wiegmann & Joachim Lätsch, Sarah Elena Timpe & Florian Stadler & David Paryla
 Season 10: Jennifer Newrkla, Jan Hartmann, Dirk Galuba & Mona Seefried & Dietrich Adam, Antje Hagen & Sepp Schauer, Nadine Warmuth & Kai Albrecht, Erich Altenkopf & Melanie Wiegmann & Joachim Lätsch, Christin Balogh & Florian Stadler
 Season 11: Magdalena Steinlein, Kai Albrecht, Dirk Galuba & Mona Seefried & Dietrich Adam, Antje Hagen & Sepp Schauer, Isabella Hübner & Michael Kuehl, Erich Altenkopf & Melanie Wiegmann & Joachim Lätsch, Christin Balogh & Florian Stadler
 Season 12: Jeannine Michèle Wacker, Max Alberti, Dirk Galuba & Mona Seefried & Dietrich Adam, Antje Hagen & Sepp Schauer, Louisa von Spies & Isabella Hübner & Michael Kuehl, Erich Altenkopf & Melanie Wiegmann & Joachim Lätsch, Christin Balogh & Florian Stadler
 Season 13: Victoria Reich & Julia Alice Ludwig, Marion Mitterhammer & Alexander Milz, Dirk Galuba & Mona Seefried & Dietrich Adam, Antje Hagen & Sepp Schauer, Louisa von Spies & Isabella Hübner & Michael Kuehl, Erich Altenkopf & Melanie Wiegmann & Joachim Lätsch, Christin Balogh & Florian Stadler

Page sequence 161, the actor in the title are called alphabetically.

Outdoor locations 
The exterior design for the fictional Hotel "Fürstenhof" is a private castle in Upper Bavaria. The shooting is generally not accessible to the public.

On the site of Bavaria Film GmbH in Green Forest Geiselgasteig In addition, a villa in the Bavaria Film City. Since March 2006, filmed for the renovated West Wingthe prince's court. For this, the facade of the Villa man wasusedin 2000 as a backdrop for the historical dramaThe Manns - Novel of a Century was built. Modeled after the original gate was renovated and rebuilt. This setting is played from the inside. In difficult weather conditions during the winter months because of the proximity to the studio, shot mostly here.

Between the scenes of the soap opera landscape studies are recorded, which are adapted to the seasonal flow. The recordings are from the foothills of the Alps. Between these scenes alternate and separate the individual scenes in the plot.

In episode 1193 to 1195 have Robert Saalfeld (Lorenzo Patané), Eva Krendlinger (Uta Kargel), Hildegard Sonnbichler (Antje Hagen) and husband Alfonso (Sepp Schauer) three days in Verona, northern Italy spent. The German actor spoke in the scenes in German and their Italian colleagues Selene Gandini, Fabio Mazzari and Enrico Mutti responded in their language. In the latter post-production were dubbed.

Music 
Each pair of protagonists in Storm of Love has a common love song that unites them.

 In the first season at Laura and Alexander, this was Bridge Over Troubled Water by Simon & Garfunkel.
 Alexander's rival with Laura Gregory had the song Stand by Me by Ben E. King.
 In the second season, which intensively studied with the love life of Robert and Miriam, was the song of the two Your Song by Elton John. During the season Miriam was married to Felix Tarrasch. Their common song was Total Eclipse of the Heart in the sung version of Glee.
 The love song from the third season with Greg and Samia was I Will Always Love You by Whitney Houston, which is already on the soundtrack for the film The Bodyguard was used.
 The love story of Emma and Felix was accompanied with the song Moon River by Barbra Streisand.
 Sandra and Luke, the pair connects the fifth season, the song Without You by Harry Nilsson.
 The Love Song of the lovers Eva and Robert, When You Say Nothing at All by Ronan Keating.
 Theresa and Moritz: Billy Joel – Honesty
 Theresa and Konstantin: Billy Joel – Just the Way You Are
 Marlene and Konstantin: Elvis Presley – Can't Help Falling in Love
 Pauline and Leonard: Lee Hazlewood & Nancy Sinatra – Summer Wine
 Julia and Niklas: Debby Boone – You Light Up My Life
 Luisa and Sebastian: Elvis Presley – Always on My Mind
 Clara and Adrian: Robbie Williams – Angels
 Ella and William: Wet Wet Wet – Love Is All Around
rebecca and  william ain't no sunshine bill withers  / 
alicia and viktor with or without u2 and scala and the kolachany brothers  
denise and  joshua eternal flame  cover versie orginaly from the bangles
franzi and   tim right here waiting richard marxx
maja and florian stay hurts
josie and paul run leona lewis
eleni and leander million dreams pink

Director 
Always five episodes will be produced in a block of five days. On each block work two directors who is a responsible for studio shooting, the other for the parallel emerging field recording.

Audience share and audience reach 
In the first six months, the market share steadily to over 20 percent at most about 3 million viewers. The target audience of 14- to 49-year-olds regularly reaches an audience of over 10 percent [28] But there were episodes with much longer range.

"Regularly seek the ARD Telenovela" Sturm der Liebe "market shares of more than 25 percent of the public for three years from – the place in the top 5 of the Public Service program is the production of the Bavaria Film therefore safe."

– Quote meters
Some standard internal records [edit] 26 September 2005: Episode 1: It reached 1.04 million viewers, an audience rating of 10.3%.
3. April 2006: Episode 121: The audience rises to over 25%.
6. August 2007: Episode 432: The most successful and September 2009, following 3.03 million viewers, a market share of 32.0%.
1. February 2008: Episode 544: 3.21 million viewers with an audience share of 25.1%, 11.5% of the young target group
14. September 2009: Episode 914: The most successful result with 3.28 million viewers, a market share of 27.9%
26. January 2010: 1000 Episode: The anniversary saw 3.13 million viewers, which is a market share of 24.1%. The special storm of love – happiness and tears at the court saw 2.2 million viewers, market share 15.2%. 
The best value in its third season was 29.7 percent market share. 3.44 million viewers, the range record set in season two there were only 3.95 million viewers, the peak labelled .

Repetition and transmission blocks 
The episodes are broadcast on a fixed channel position of the ARD. All third party programs repeat the series in the morning program on the following day. In addition, there is a repeat in the night. As part of the internet in the last episodes of ARD library will be available. For the curious, there are on the web site of the ARD a synopsis and a cast list for four weeks in advance. The hr-TV, the first episodes of the telenovela was repeated. But decided the third programs (according to own data) to repeat only new episodes, since storm of love alone is a trademark of ARD.

ORF has bought the serial rights and repeated the following morning on each ORF2.

Pocket folders 
In January 2007, published monthly in the pocket guide series Publisher Cora storm of love. Here are written by Johanna Theden of the scripts be rejected novels. As the title pictures stills from the TV series are used.

As of July 2006 saw the storm of love – photo story. The first volume came as a photo book, the romantic love story of Laura and Alexander to be reprinted. The second edition was issued in August 2008, and showed the stars of the series in exciting scenes. Are complemented by background information on the novels series. The series is published once a year. The author remains anonymous.

Prizes and awards 
 2010: German TV Award 2010 in the category Best daily series.
 2009: On Fantag Sepp Schauer received the Fan Award (from 50,000 votes) on the grounds of Bavaria.
 2008: Premio Napoli Classic for Cultural and Martin Gruber Susan Hoecke as Victoria and Felix Tarrasch.
 2007: Premio Napoli Cultural Classic for Lorenzo Patané as Robert Saalfeld.
 2007: Smoke-free seal for storm of love because of the deliberate decision on smoking characters.

International broadcast

References

External links 
 Storm of Love-Spoiler 

German telenovelas
2005 German television series debuts
2010s German television series
German-language television shows
Das Erste telenovelas